Dakoda Motor Co. (also Dakoda Motor Company) is an American Christian rock band.

History
Dakoda Motor Co. formed in the early 1990s; among its members was Peter King, a professional surfer and host of the MTV show Sandblast. They signed with Myrrh Records in 1993 and released two albums before moving to Atlantic Records in 1996.

Members
 Davia Vallesillo – vocals
 Melissa Brewer – vocals (after Vallesillo left)
 Peter King – vocals, guitar
 Elliot Chenault – guitar
 Derik Toy – bass guitar
 Chuck Cummings – drums

Discography
 Into the Son (Myrrh, 1993) U.S. Christian No. 25
 Welcome Race Fans (Myrrh, 1994) U.S. Christian No. 14
 Railroad (Atlantic, 1996)

References

External links
 

Alternative rock groups from California
Christian rock groups from California
Musical groups established in 1991
Myrrh Records artists
1991 establishments in California